Miocnus is an extinct genus of ground sloths of the family Megalocnidae endemic to Cuba during the Pleistocene and very early Holocene epochs, living from 1.8 Mya—11,000 years ago, existing for approximately .

Taxonomy
Miocnus was named by Matthew (1931). Its type is Miocnus antillensis. It was assigned to Megalonychidae by Matthew (1931) based on morphological considerations, and subsequently moved to Megalocnidae by Presslee et al. (2019) based on molecular sequence data.

Fossil distribution
Sites and ages of specimen (complete list):
Casimba, Cuba ~1.8 Mya–11,000 years ago.

References

Prehistoric sloths
Pleistocene xenarthrans
Pleistocene mammals of North America
Pleistocene genus extinctions
Pleistocene Caribbean
Fossils of Cuba
Fossil taxa described in 1931